"Sangria" is a song recorded by American country music artist Blake Shelton.  It was released to country radio on April 6, 2015, as the third single from his ninth studio album, Bringing Back the Sunshine.  The song was written by J. T. Harding, Josh Osborne and Trevor Rosen. It climbed to No. 1 position in Canada Country and US Country Airplay charts and also at No. 38 on Billboard Hot 100.

Critical reception
Giving it an "A", Tammy Ragusa of Country Weekly wrote that "With a subtle and appropriately Spanish flavor, reminiscent of Tracy Byrd's 'Just Let Me Be in Love', this cha-cha is super-sexy, thanks in large part to a suggestive lyric."

Commercial performance
The single peaked at number one on the Country Airplay chart on July 11, 2015, and it is Shelton's twentieth No. 1 hit on the chart, and his fifteenth consecutive single to achieve the feat, which is unmatched by other artists. It also peaked at number 38 on the Billboard Hot 100 the same week.  The song was certified Gold by the RIAA on June 25, 2015, and Platinum on January 29, 2016.  The song has sold 846,000 copies in the US as of May 2016.

Music video
The music video was directed by Trey Fanjoy and premiered in March 2015.

Charts and certifications

Peak positions

Year-end charts

Certifications

References

2014 songs
2015 singles
Country ballads
2010s ballads
Blake Shelton songs
Warner Records Nashville singles
Songs written by J. T. Harding
Songs written by Josh Osborne
Songs written by Trevor Rosen
Song recordings produced by Scott Hendricks
Music videos directed by Trey Fanjoy
Warner Records singles